Archibald Edward Gouldie (November 22, 1936 – January 23, 2016) was a Canadian professional wrestler. He wrestled for Stampede Wrestling for decades as Archie "The Stomper" Gouldie, with the nickname coming from the wrestler's reputation of "stomping" on his opponents, when they were down, with his black cowboy boots. He was also known by the ring name The Mongolian Stomper.

Professional wrestling career

Central States Wrestling
Early in his career, Archie "The Stomper" Gouldie was a babyface (good guy) in the Central States territory. He won the NWA United States Heavyweight Championship (Central States Version) from Enrique Torres in St. Joseph on Dec. 20, 1963, losing it to Rocky Hamilton on Jan 31, 1964. He regained it on May 22, 1964, only to lose it to Sonny Myers June 12, 1964. He regained it yet again in 1965 from Sonny Myers, and dropped it to Bobby Shane in December in Waterloo, IA.

Archie won his first Central States Heavyweight Title from Ron Reed in St.Joseph, MO. on June 4, 1965, holding it for 30 days, dropping it to Sonny Myers on July 4, 1965, in Kansas City, KS. Gouldie won the title for the second time on June 8, 1972, from Black Angus Campbell in St. Joseph, MO., only to lose it to Harley Race on July 7, 1972, in Kansas City, KS.

Archie also proved himself to be an accomplished tag team wrestler, winning the NWA North American Tag Team Championship eleven times. His first reign began May 1, 1962, with his last title run coming on Oct 14, 1972. The Stomper teamed up four times with The Viking, three times with Bob Geigel, twice with Rufus R. Jones, once with Danny Little Bear, and once with Bob Ellis for a total of approximately 238 days.

Stampede Wrestling
Gouldie held the North American heavyweight title a record 14 times between 1968 and 1984, quite a streak of longevity for that time frame.  He was also the first champion, defeating former NWA World Heavyweight Champion Pat O'Connor in the tournament finals. Gouldie feuded with British mat technician Billy Robinson, among others, for the title.

Although he wrestled as a heel during the majority of his Stampede tenure, Gouldie made a face turn late in 1983 after Bad News Allen turned against Gouldie and his storyline "son", Jeff, during a six-man tag team match and brutalized and injured Jeff (which led to Stampede TV host Ed Whalen to quit the company in protest); the attack led to a bloody feud which climaxed with Gouldie defeating Bad News for the Stampede North American title (his 14th, and what would be final, reign).

Gouldie never used the Mongolian Stomper gimmick while wrestling in Stampede; instead, staying true to his roots, he went with the gimmick of a tough Alberta cowboy as just "The Stomper" from Carbon, Alberta.

Southeast Championship Wrestling
Gouldie achieved most of his U.S. fame in this territory, based in Knoxville, Tennessee. He held the NWA Southeast Heavyweight Championship a record eleven times between 1976 and 1981, winning it for the last time against Jerry Stubbs and losing it to Jos LeDuc. He feuded with Robert Fuller and Ronnie Garvin over the title.

Mid South Wrestling (Bill Watts)

Gouldie appeared very briefly in Mid South in late-1982, saving Skandor Akbar from an attack by Buck Robley. He only wrestled one or two matches before abruptly leaving the territory.

Smoky Mountain Wrestling
In 1992 Gouldie joined SMW, which, like Southeast, was based in Knoxville, Tennessee. At this point in his career, the Stomper was considered a babyface, teaming with former rival Ronnie Garvin in his feud with Paul Orndorff and feuding with Kevin Sullivan's latest incarnation of evil wrestlers. Gouldie defeated Rob Morgan at the first Bluegrass Brawl in Pikeville, Ky.  According to several magazines, Gouldie maintained his shape by riding his bicycle almost everywhere he went, sometimes riding up to 60 miles a day.

Personal life
After his wrestling career came to an end, Gouldie served for several years as a deputy sheriff in Knox County, Tennessee, working as a correctional officer. Until his health began to fail him, he worked in the guard shack at a prison. Before that, he ran the paddy wagon for three years until he "got tired of hauling drunks."

In 2011, memory issues began.

Death
On January 9, 2016, Gouldie fell and broke his hip, which required surgery. After the surgery, he never recovered and died in his sleep on January 23.

Championships and accomplishments
All-Star Championship Wrestling
ASCW Heavyweight Championship (2 times)
Big Time Wrestling (San Francisco)
NWA World Tag Team Championship (San Francisco version) (1 time) – with Ciclon Negro
Central States Wrestling
NWA Central States Heavyweight Championship (2 times)
NWA United States Heavyweight Championship (Central States version) (3 times)
NWA North American Tag Team Championship (Central States version) (11 time) – with Bob Ellis
Championship Wrestling from Florida 
NWA Southern Heavyweight Championship (Florida version) (2 times)
Georgia Championship Wrestling
NWA National Heavyweight Championship (1 time)
International Wrestling
IW North American Heavyweight Championship (4 times)
NWA Detroit
NWA World Tag Team Championship (Detroit version) (2 times) – with Ben Justice (2)
NWA Mid-America – Continental Wrestling Association
AWA Southern Heavyweight Championship (1 time)
AWA Southern Tag Team Championship (1 time) – with Jerry Lawler
CWA International Heavyweight Championship (1 time)
NWA Southern Heavyweight Championship (Memphis version) (1 time)
Pro Wrestling Illustrated
PWI ranked him # 290 of the 500 best singles wrestlers during the PWI Years in 2003.
Southeastern Championship Wrestling – Continental Wrestling Federation
CWF Tag Team Championship (1 time) – with Jimmy Golden
NWA Brass Knuckles Championship (Southeastern version) (3 times)
NWA Southeastern Heavyweight Championship (Northern Division) (11 times)
NWA Southeastern Heavyweight Championship (Southern Division) (1 time)
NWA Southeastern Tag Team Championship (2 times) – with Jimmy Golden (1) and Stomper Jr. (1)
NWA Southeastern Television Championship (1 time)
Southern Championship Wrestling
NWA Southern Heavyweight Championship (Tennessee version) (1 time)
Southern States Wrestling
SSW Heavyweight Championship (1 time)
Southwest Championship Wrestling
SCW Southwest Heavyweight Championship (1 time)
Stampede Wrestling
Stampede North American Heavyweight Championship (14 times)
Stampede Wrestling Hall of Fame (Class of 1995)
Tennessee Mountain Wrestling
TMW Heavyweight Championship (2 times)
TMW Tag Team Championship (1 time) – with Chris Powers
United Atlantic Championship Wrestling
UACW Heavyweight Championship (2 times)
UACW Tag Team Championship (1 time) – with Big Jesse
USA Wrestling
USA Heavyweight Championship (3 times)
World Wrestling Council
WWC Puerto Rico Heavyweight Championship (1 time)

References

External links

 Archie "Stomper" Gouldie career record at SLAM! Wrestling
 Canadian Pro Wrestling Page of Fame entry
 Memphis Wrestling History
 

1936 births
2016 deaths
Canadian expatriate professional wrestlers in the United States
Canadian male professional wrestlers
Faux Mongolian professional wrestlers
Professional wrestling promoters
People from Kneehill County
Professional wrestlers from Calgary
Professional wrestlers from Tennessee
Stampede Wrestling alumni
20th-century professional wrestlers
WWC Puerto Rico Champions
AWA International Heavyweight Champions
NWA National Heavyweight Champions
NWA Southern Heavyweight Champions (Florida version)
NWA Canadian Heavyweight Champions (Calgary version)
Stampede Wrestling North American Heavyweight Champions